The Greenwood Cup Stakes is a Grade III American Thoroughbred horse race for three-year-olds and older, over a distance of one-and-one-half miles on the dirt held annually in September during the fall meeting at Parx Casino and Racing in Bensalem, Pennsylvania. The current purse is $200,000.

History
The race is named for Greenwood Racing, Inc. who purchased Philadelphia Park in December 1990.

The inaugural running of the event was on 8 June 2002 under handicap conditions on held on the turf course as the Greenwood Cup Handicap. The event was won by multiple Grade I winner, the Dr. John A. Chandler bred and owned eight-year-old Cetewayo, who finished strongly as the 1/2 odds-on favorite to win by a length in a time of 2:35.01. The following year the event was moved off the turf and raced on a sloppy dirt track and was won by Golden Ticket who led all the way winning by ten-and-one-quarter lengths.

The event was not held between 2005 and 2007. When the event resumed it was scheduled in mid-July and was held on the dirt track as a stakes allowance.

Previously a Listed race, the event was upgraded to Grade III status for 2012 by the American Graded Stakes Committee.

In 2013, Eldaafer a former winner of the Grade III Breeders' Cup Marathon won the event as an eight year old.

In 2020, Parx Racing cancelled their race meeting due to the COVID-19 pandemic in the United States.

Records
Speed record
 miles: 2:28.01  	Redeemed  (2012)

 Margins
 lengths –  	Madefromlucky (2017)

Most wins by a trainer
 2 - Brendan P. Walsh  (2014, 2016)
 2 - Todd A. Pletcher (2017, 2018)

Most wins by a jockey
 4 - Paco Lopez (2015, 2018, 2021, 2022)

Most wins by an owner
 No owner has won this event more than once

Winners

Legend:

 
 

Notes:

† In the 2011 running, A. U. Miner was first past the post and wagering was paid out as the winner, however the horse returned a positive swab for methylprednisolone and was disqualified from first place purse money. The redistributed winner's purse went to Birdrun, who finished second.

See also
 List of American and Canadian Graded races

References

Horse races in Pennsylvania
Graded stakes races in the United States
Grade 3 stakes races in the United States
Open middle distance horse races
Parx Casino and Racing
Recurring sporting events established in 2002
2002 establishments in Pennsylvania